The Roy Campanella Award is given annually to the Los Angeles Dodgers player who best exemplifies the spirit and leadership of the late Hall of Fame Brooklyn Dodger catcher, Roy Campanella. The award is voted on by all Los Angeles Dodgers uniformed personnel, players, and coaches. The award has been given out since 2006.

Winners
See footnote

Other team awards for spirit in Major League Baseball
 The San Francisco Giants have given the Willie Mac Award since 1980 to "the player on the San Francisco Giants who best exemplifies the spirit and leadership consistently shown by Willie McCovey throughout his long career."
The Oakland Athletics have given the Catfish Hunter Award since 2004 to the "player whose play on the field and conduct in the clubhouse best exemplifies the courageous, competitive and inspirational spirit demonstrated by the late pitcher, Jim "Catfish" Hunter."

See also
Awards given to members of specific teams

References

Los Angeles Dodgers lists
Major League Baseball team trophies and awards
Awards established in 2006